Edelstein is the German word for "gemstone". Edelstein is also a surname of German origin which means "noble stone" or in its literal sense "precious stone".

Surname:
 People with this surname include:
 Arnold Edelstein, Austrian-American cartoonist known as Ed Arno
 David Edelstein, American film critic 
 Erez Edelstein, Israeli basketball coach
 Eric Edelstein, American actor
 Frances Edelstein, American businesswoman
 Gershon Edelstein, Israeli rabbi
 Gordon Edelstein, American theatre director
 Jakob Edelstein, the first Judenältester (Jewish Elder) in the Theresienstadt ghetto 
 Joseph Edelstein, American Yiddish Theater Theatrical Manager and Theater Owner and Director. 
 Pauline Edelstein, American Yiddish Theatre actress and wife of Joseph Edelstein.
 Lisa Edelstein, American actress
 Ludwig Edelstein, German-born American classical scholar and historian of medicine
 Melville Edelstein, sociologist
 Morris Michael Edelstein, American lawyer and politician
 Neal Edelstein, American film producer
 Oscar Edelstein, Argentinian composer
 Robert Edelstein, American economist
 Samson Samsonov (né Edelstein), Russian film director and screenwriter
 Stuart J. Edelstein, Swiss-American biophysicist
 Victor Edelstein, British fashion designer
 Yoel Edelstein, Israeli politician
 William A. Edelstein, American physicist
 Variations:
 Charles Edelstenne, French billionaire
 Vladimir Zhirinovsky (né Eidelstein), Russian politician, nobleman
 Sigmund Zois Freiherr von Edelstein

Toponymy:
 Edelstein, Illinois

Other :
 Edelstein Award (known as the HIST Award for Outstanding Achievement in the History of Chemistry), prize given by the American Chemical Society
 The Edelstein Center for Social Research, Brazilian think tank
 Edelsteinaspididae, taxonomy
 Precious Stones (film), German title Edelsteine, 1918 German silent film
 Rashba–Edelstein effect, physics

See also
 Æthelstan (disambiguation), the Old English cognate name

Jewish surnames
German-language surnames
Yiddish-language surnames
Surnames from ornamental names